A Jewish cemetery ( beit almin or  beit kvarot) is a cemetery where Jews are buried in keeping with Jewish tradition. Cemeteries are referred to in several different ways in Hebrew, including beit kevarot (house of sepulchers), beit almin (eternal home) or beit olam [haba], (house of afterlife), the beit chayyim (house of the living) and beit shalom (house of peace).

The land of the cemetery is considered holy and a special consecration ceremony takes place upon its inauguration. According to Jewish tradition, Jewish burial grounds are sacred sites and must remain undisturbed in perpetuity. Establishing a cemetery is one of the first priorities for a new Jewish community. A Jewish cemetery is generally purchased and supported with communal funds. Placing stones on graves is a Jewish tradition equivalent to bringing flowers or wreaths to graves. Flowers, spices, and twigs have sometimes been used, but the stone is preferred because among the Jewish religion it is perceived specifically as a Jewish custom.

Showing proper respect for the dead (kevod ha-met) is intrinsic to Jewish law. The connection between the soul and the human body after death is an essential aspect of Jewish belief in the eternity of the soul. Thus, disinterring the dead, deriving benefit from a corpse or grave, or acting in any way that may be perceived as "ridiculing the helpless" (l’oeg l’rash), such as making derogatory remarks or joking, but also partaking in the pleasures or needs of the living, such as eating, drinking or smoking, are forbidden in the presence of the dead.

Showing proper respect for the dead also requires a prompt burial, the waiver of certain rabbinic restrictions on Shabbat and religious holidays to ensure proper care of the dead, the ritual cleaning (tahara) and dressing of the body in shrouds (tachrichim) before burial, and laws concerning proper conduct in a cemetery.  

To ensure that the requirements for Jewish burial are met and that each member of the community is afforded a proper burial, Jewish communities establish burial societies known as the Chevra Kadisha (The Holy Society) to provide these services free of charge. In larger Jewish communities, cemeteries are sometimes subdivided into sections according to the chevra kadisha that uses and is responsible for that section of the cemetery's care and upkeep.

History

Early Jewish cemeteries were located outside of the city. In the Diaspora, it is traditional to bury the dead with the feet in the direction of Jerusalem. The tombstones usually have inscriptions in Hebrew and the regional language. During the Nazi Germany regime, Jewish cemeteries all over Europe were destroyed and desecrated; for this reason, some cemeteries have therefore also become Holocaust memorials, such as the cemetery in the Warsaw Ghetto.

The largest Jewish cemeteries of Europe can be found in Budapest, Łódź, Prague, Warsaw, Vienna and Berlin. Other Jewish cemeteries in Europe include the Jewish Cemetery in Khotyn and the Chatam Sofer Memorial (part of the Old Jewish Cemetery in Bratislava). Founded in 1832, the Jewish Cemetery of Coro, in Venezuela is the oldest Jewish cemetery in continuous use in the Americas.

Jewish cemetery projects 

The mission of the International Jewish Cemetery Project is to document every Jewish burial site in the world.

The Lo Tishkach European Jewish Cemeteries Initiative  was established in 2006 as a joint project of the Conference of European Rabbis and the Conference on Jewish Material Claims Against Germany. It aims to guarantee the effective and lasting preservation of Jewish cemeteries and mass graves throughout the European continent.

The ESJF European Jewish Cemeteries Initiative was established in 2015 as a German-based nonprofit. It received the initial grant of 1 million euros from German government in 2015 In November 2018 the EJSF received a European Union grant for a mass survey project of Jewish burial sites using drones. In December 2019 further funding was granted for a new 2019-2021 project "Protecting the Jewish cemeteries of Europe: Continuation of the mapping process, stakeholders’ involvement and awareness raising".

See also
 Bereavement in Judaism
:Category:Jewish cemeteries by country

References

External links
 IAJGS International Jewish Cemetery Project
 JewishGen Online Worldwide Burial Registry
 Database of European Jewish Burial Grounds
Jewish Burial Grounds: Understanding Values - Historic England